The Beer Hall Boycott of South Africa was a women-led national campaign of boycotting municipal beerhalls. According to the Native Beer Act of 1908 it was illegal for women to brew traditional beer. Police raided homes and destroyed home brewed liquor so that men would use municipal beerhalls. In response, women attacked the beerhalls and destroyed equipment and buildings.

Alcohol legislation
Legislation restricted African natives from consuming European-produced alcohol. Educated African men were issued permits, which allowed them to consume European wine, spirits and malt beer. The average uneducated person would consume sorghum beer made by African women. South Africa lost its preferential trade status in the Commonwealth when it became a republic in 1961. This put the export trade of wine and beer under threat and soon there was an increasing demand for the lifting of the prohibition.

Before 1928 African women played an important role in beer brewing for government structures and beer halls. The sorghum beer sales in municipalities was an industry worth R3 million in 1961. The Liquor Amendment Act of 1962 lifted authority on Africans as liquor consumers. Africans were prohibited from entering the liquor market, however, they could purchase liquor from 'non-European' entrances of white bottle stores. By the 1950s, police were no longer able to control the sales of 'European' liquor in urban areas. The South African police stated that the lifting of the prohibition would normalise the drinking habits of African people.

Beer Hall Boycott
The boycott of the beer-halls was an indication of the growing discontent of people against many oppressive measures before democracy in South Africa.
Beer Hall Riots started in 1929 nationwide. These boycotts and riots were in response to the Native Beer Act of 1908 which resulted in many African women in urban and rural areas losing a source of income. Tradition beer brewers were resistant towards municipal beer halls as they gave authority to councils to sell African beer and the African brewer would no longer be able to make an income. The Natal branch of the Industrial and Commercial Workers Union (ICU) promoted for the closure of municipal Beer Halls. Between 1950 and 1951 alone, municipal profits from beer sales exceeded £175 000 and by 1952, profits of over £200 000 were made. During the 1976 Soweto riots, student mobs attacked beer halls. Almost every beer hall in Soweto was affected during the Soweto uprising. The police killed several Diepkloof rioters as they fled from a beer hall during demonstrations. The beer halls which were destroyed during 1976 were never rebuilt.

Durban
Discussions of Beer Hall Boycotts started in as early as 1926 in Durban. On the 17 June 1959 in Cato Manor, KwaZulu Natal a demonstration was staged by a group of African women at the Cato Manor Beer Hall against liqueur legislation. Other protesters entered a beer hall and destroyed beer and other property. The police dispersed the protesters and maintained surveillance throughout the evening. On the 18 June 1959 demonstrations against the liqueur legislation had spread to Dalton Road and Victoria Street in the city of Durban. This area is now part of the Liberation Heritage Route. Men present at these Beer Halls during the demonstrations were attacked and warned against supporting municipal beer halls. Director of the Bantu Administration Department, Mr Bourquin, addressed approximately 2000 women at the Cato Manor Beer Hall. After the women resisted orders from the police to disperse, a police baton charge took place. In a statement in the House of Assembly, the Minister for Justice stated that 25 buildings had been burnt down and 7 damaged, all associated to the Beer Hall riots. Beer Halls were temporarily closed and municipal bus services suspended after numerous attacks on vehicles. In June 1959 over 2000 women marched against men drinking in Beer Halls.  The protestors organised a beer boycott which led to wide-scale uprisings all over Natal. During 1959, an estimated 20 000 women in Natal protested and more than 1 000 were convicted in the courts.

Eastern Cape
In 1938, African women held a meeting at the East London City Hall which led to protest action against the approval of the Minister of Native Affairs in granting the Council the exclusive right to brew and supply beer from the 1 July 1938. Over 200 women marched to the City Hall to interview the Mayor. The legislation affected many women who earned a living through brewing beer in shebeens. It is estimated that over 20 000 women from 30 areas participated in various demonstrations, including the Beer Hall Boycotts.

Notable people

Dorothy Nomzansi Nyembe

Dorothy Nomzansi Nyembe was born on the 31st of December 1931 near Dundee in KwaZulu-Natal. She participated in the establishment of the ANC Women’s League in Cato Manor. She was one of the leaders against the removals from Cato Manor in 1956, and also one of the leaders of the beer hall boycotts.

Mary Ngalo
Mary Ngalo was born in Cradock, Eastern Cape. She was arrested during the beer hall boycotts on 1957 and sentenced to one month's imprisonment.

See also
Beer in Africa
Apartheid
Umqombothi

External links

http://abahlali.org/files/1929.pdf
http://wiredspace.wits.ac.za/bitstream/handle/10539/7909/HWS-257.pdf

References

Opposition to apartheid in South Africa
Events associated with apartheid
Civil disobedience
Protests in South Africa
Women's marches
Boycotts of apartheid South Africa